The 1923 The Citadel Bulldogs football team represented The Citadel, The Military College of South Carolina in the 1923 college football season.  Carl Prause served as head coach for the second season.  The Bulldogs played as members of the Southern Intercollegiate Athletic Association and played home games at College Park Stadium in Hampton Park.

Schedule

References

Citadel Bulldogs
The Citadel Bulldogs football seasons
Citadel football